Sainik School, Lucknow was established in July 1960. One of the best boarding school in India. The only one of the sainik schools to be administered by the state government, the alumni of which, Captain Manoj Pandey, posthumously received Param Vir Chakra. It was the first Sainik School in the country and was followed by the setting up of other Sainik Schools, under the Ministry of Defence, Government of India, on the same lines. The education in this school is subsidised by the Government of Uttar Pradesh. It is a co-ed (for both boys and girls) residential English medium school affiliated to CBSE Board.

Mission 
The school's mission is to seek representation of Uttar Pradesh in the officer cadre of the Defence services through the National Defence Academy and Indian Naval Academy. Therefore, the school imparts military-oriented training to its cadets.

Sainik School is a residential English medium school. The school is a member of Indian Public Schools conference and is included in the Government of India list of meritorious scholars.

The Sainik School is 15 km from Lucknow city. The Lucknow airport is 3 km away and the nearest railhead is Char Bagh, which is 13 km from the school.

The school prepares boys and girls for the science stream of the Central Board of Secondary Education Examination (CBSE) for Class 10 and 12, New Delhi. The school provides education to boys from Class 7 to 12.From 2023 batch starts for class 6th also.

Management 
The school is run by the Uttar Pradesh Sainik Schools Society, which is registered under the Indian Societies Registration Act (1860). It is the only Sainik school which is completely financed and managed by the State Government.

Facilities 
As a boarding school, the school provides accommodation to its staff in the school campus. Government of India Scheme of Scholarships in approved residential Secondary Schools is operational in the School.

It has extensive playgrounds and its own stadium Major salman Ahmad khan shaurya chakra Stadium. The school has facilities for games like hockey, cricket, football, basketball, volleyball, badminton, boxing, table tennis, horse riding and swimming. The cadets go through rigorous physical training throughout their stay. The school follows a timetable for compulsory games and physical training.

Its academic facilities include science laboratories for physics, chemistry and biology; separate music and art rooms; and a library. There are six hostels for the cadets.

The school has six houses named after personalities, Shastri,Panth Nehru, S.N, Kidwai and Tandon. The school has a cadet’s mess and a sick bay, the latter overseen by a Resident Medical Officer.

Admission 
Admission is on the basis of a competitive examination and interview, which is followed by a medical examination by a Military Medical Board at the Command hospital, Lucknow.

Boys having UP's domicile certificate between the age of 10 and 12 years as on 2 July, of the year of admission are eligible to apply. The boy must have passed class 6 from a recognised school. The child is admitted according to the final placement in the merit list and the number of vacancies available in the school.

The academic year of the School has been divided into: 
 First Term 1 July to 24 December.
 Second Term 15 January to 30 April.
 Summer Vacation from about 3 May to about 30 June.
 Winter Vacation from about 24 December to about 15 January.

As of 2018, the school began admitting girls to its programs.

Notable alumni

Gallantry award winners 
Alumni who have won a Gallantry award
Capt Manoj Kumar Pandey, PVC (Posthumously)

Alumni who rose to the rank of Maj Gen/ Equivalent and above

Alumni civil dignitaries 
Mr Harsh Vardhan - Member of Parliament 
Mr Vierendrra Lalit - Film Maker(Film Director-Cinematographer), Mumbai.

References

External links
 

Sainik schools
Boys' schools in India
Boarding schools in Uttar Pradesh
High schools and secondary schools in Uttar Pradesh
Schools in Lucknow
Educational institutions established in 1960
1960 establishments in Uttar Pradesh